Reflections in Change is the third album led by saxophonist Craig Handy which was recorded in 1999 and released on the Sirrocco Music label.

Reception

The AllMusic review by Scott Yanow said "A fine hard bop tenor saxophonist, Craig Handy performs four of his originals, four by drummer Ali Jackson, and Charles Mingus' "Eclipse." ... The leader plays some particularly rewarding soprano and his program is well-paced with plenty of variety, swinging in a modern fashion with just enough unpredictability to keep one guessing". On All About Jazz, Robert Dugan stated "Handy is fully in charge of an excellent quartet ... the bulk of Reflections In Change showcases Handy's capacious blowing, and he sounds relaxed, unfettered and elated"

Track listing
All compositions by Craig Handy except where noted
 "Turnerland" (Ali Jackson) – 5:12
 "Snowqualmie" (Jackson) – 6:16
 "Waiting for Your Call" – 5:28
 "Eclipse" (Charles Mingus) – 6:58
 "For Kenny" (Jackson) – 6:38
 "Unravel the Mystery" – 6:41
 "Homage" (Jackson) – 6:23
 "Adona's Song: Prelude" – 2:28
 "Adona's Song" – 6:15

Personnel
Craig Handy – soprano saxophone, tenor saxophone, bass clarinet
Geri Allen – piano
Rodney Whitaker – double bass
Ali Jackson – drums
Dave Stryker – guitar (tracks 3 & 6)
Tara Cruise – vocals (tracks 3 & 6)
Steve Slagle – flute (tracks 4 & 9)
Peck Almond – trumpet (tracks 4 & 9)
Robin Eubanks – trombone (tracks 4 & 9)
Chris Komer – French horn (tracks 4 & 9)
Mike Simm – clarinet (tracks 4 & 9)
Mike Rabinowitz – bassoon (tracks 4 & 9)
Sy Johnson – arranger (tracks 4 & 9)

References

Craig Handy albums
1999 albums